T Ceti is a semiregular variable star located in the equatorial constellation of Cetus. It varies between magnitudes 5.0 and 6.9 over 159.3 days. It is moving further from the Earth with a heliocentric radial velocity of +29 km/s.

This is an MS-type star on the asymptotic giant branch with a spectral type of M5-6Se. (The 'e' notation indicates the presence of emission lines in the spectrum.) It is a long period Mira variable with changing cycle lengths, showing a variation in its spectral features over the course of each cycle. Pulsation periods of 388, 398, and 382 days have been reported, as well as variations in the amplitude, which may indicate dual pulsation cycles that are interfering with each other.

T Ceti has an estimated three times the mass of the Sun and has expanded to 275 times the Sun's radius. It is radiating 8,128 times the Sun's luminosity from its enlarged photosphere at an effective temperature of 3,396 K.

References

M-type giants
S-type stars
Emission-line stars
Asymptotic-giant-branch stars
Semiregular variable stars
Cetus (constellation)
Durchmusterung objects
001760
001728
0085
Ceti, T